Long Duckmanton is a village in the civil parish of Sutton cum Duckmanton between Bolsover and Chesterfield, in North East Derbyshire, England. It is located 3 km west of Bolsover and about 18 km south-east of the city of Sheffield.

See also
Listed buildings in Sutton cum Duckmanton

References

External links

Villages in Derbyshire
Towns and villages of the Peak District
North East Derbyshire District